Art Deco is an album by jazz trumpeter Don Cherry recorded in 1988 and released on the A&M label. His quartet played at the Village Vanguard before recording the album.

Reception

The AllMusic review by Scott Yanow awarded the album 4 stars stating "this set is quite accessible and finds all of the musicians in top form".

Writer Michael Stephans called the album "surprisingly traditional-sounding," and commented: "The session is quite relaxed, and... all four musicians are at the top of their game."

Track listing
All compositions by Don Cherry except where noted
 "Art Deco" - 8:38 
 "When Will the Blues Leave?" (Ornette Coleman) - 7:08 
 "Body and Soul" (Frank Eyton, Johnny Green, Edward Heyman, Robert Sour) - 6:30
 "Bemsha Swing" (Denzil Best, Thelonious Monk) - 9:39
 "Maffy" - 0:39 
 "Folk Medley" (Charlie Haden) - 2:42 
 "The Blessing" (Coleman) - 5:32
 "Passing" - 3:00 
 "I've Grown Accustomed to Her Face" (Frederick Loewe, Alan Jay Lerner) - 6:50 
 "Compute" (Coleman) - 5:05

Personnel
Don Cherry — trumpet
James Clay — tenor saxophone
Charlie Haden — bass
Billy Higgins — drums

References

A&M Records albums
Don Cherry (trumpeter) albums
1989 albums
Albums recorded at Van Gelder Studio